Azorella aretioides is a species of flowering plant in the genus Azorella found in Colombia and Ecuador. Azorella aretioides var. elongata is a variety of the species, also found in Colombia and Ecuador.

External links
 Azorella aretioides

fuegiana
Flora of Colombia
Flora of Ecuador
Plants described in 1818